is a Japanese women's professional shogi player ranked 1-dan.

Early life
Ōshima was born in Hiroshima, Japan on January 31, 2003. She learned how to play shogi from her father.

Women's professional shogi
Ōshima entered the Japan Shogi Association's training group system under the guidance of shogi professional . She satisfied the criteria for the rank of women's professional 2-kyū upon obtaining promotion to Training Group B2.

Promotion history
Ōshima's promotion history is as follows:

 2-kyū: May 1, 2021
 1-kyū: June 26, 2021
 1-dan: April 1, 2022

Note: All ranks are women's professional ranks.

References

External links
 ShogiHub: Ōshima, Ayaka

2003 births
Living people
People from Hiroshima
Japanese shogi players
Women's professional shogi players
Professional shogi players from Hiroshima Prefecture